Vagisa Munivar also spelled as Vageesa Munivar is said to have lived in the 12th Century. He is the author of Gnanamrutham (Ambrosia of knowledge) also spelled as Gnanamritham, Jnanamrtam or Nanamridham, an important work of medieval Shaiva literature written in Tamil.

Gnanmritham is divided into 8 parts:
Sammiya Gnanam
Sammiya Darisnam
Pasa Bandham
Degaantharam
Pasanadittuvam
Pasaceddam
Patinicaayam
Pasamochanam

References

Shaivism
Tamil-language literature